Pakistan Secretariat serves as the headquarters for the Cabinet and Government of Pakistan. It is located on Red Zone in Islamabad, Capital Territory, Pakistan.

Blocks

 Block A: 
Ministry of Commerce & Textile Industry
Ministry of Industries & Production
Ministry of Petroleum & Natural Resources
Ministry of Water & Power
 Block B: 
Ministry of National Food Security & Research
 Block C: 
 Block D: 
Ministry of Communications
Ministry of Railways
 Block E:
 Block F:
 Block G:
 Block H:
 Block I:
 Block J:
 Block K:
 Block L:
 Block M:
 Block N:
 Block O:
 Block P:
Ministry of Planning & Development
 Block Q:
Ministry of Finance, Revenue & Economic Affairs
 Block R:
Ministry of Interior
Ministry of Law & Justice
Ministry of Kashmir Affairs & Gilgit-Baltistan
 Block S:
Ministry of States & Frontier Regions
 Block T:
 Block U:
 Block V:
 Block W:
 Block X:
 Block Y:
 Block Z:

References

Government of Pakistan
Sectors of Islamabad